Maxim Vavulin (born 6 May 1998) is a Russian chess grandmaster.

Chess career
Born in Moscow in 1998, Vavulin earned his international master title in 2013 and his grandmaster title in 2018. He won the European Individual Rapid Chess Championship in 2017.

References

External links

Living people
1998 births
Chess grandmasters
Sportspeople from Moscow
Russian chess players